Eulalia "Sister" Bourne (Dec 23, 1892 – May 1, 1984) was a pioneer Arizona schoolteacher, rancher and writer. She taught at rural Arizona schools from 1914 to 1957.

Biography
Eulalia Collins was born in West Texas, the oldest of five girls. She was dubbed "Sister" by a younger sibling who couldn't pronounce Eulalia. After a sketchy education, she got her first teaching job circa 1910 in Beaver Creek in Arizona's Verde Valley.  Bourne's next teaching job was at Helvetia, a mining camp in the Santa Rita Mountains south of Tucson. None of her students spoke English, nor did Bourne speak Spanish. At that time, Arizona had a law forbidding the use of Spanish in school.  She sent away for Spanish grammar books, and set aside the last five minutes of each day for the students to teach her Spanish. When she was 17, she married William S. Bourne. She received an uncontested divorce in 1915, continuing to use the Bourne surname throughout her lifetime.

Bourne entered the University of Arizona in Tucson in 1920, but it took her ten years to graduate, working her way through school, majoring in English and Spanish. After graduating summa cum laude, she took a job in the isolated ranching community of Redington. There she created The Little Cowpuncher, a mimeographed newspaper, written and illustrated by her students. It was begun, as Bourne later explained, as an effort “to hold the mirror up to life as we live it here.” The little paper and the mimeograph machine moved with her from school to school for the next 11 years: from Redington to Baboquívari then to Sierrita, Sasco, Sasabe, Sópori and back to Sasabe. With its lively, detailed descriptions of ranch and school life, it is now seen as a unique historical document of Southern Arizona ranching communities from 1932 to 1943. A complete set is available online here.

"Sister Bourne was a complicated personality. She subscribed to The New Yorker magazine and was a member of the Arizona Cattlemen’s Association. She was a rancher who hated rodeos because she saw them as animal cruelty. She wouldn’t divulge her age or details of her private life, but freely offered her often unpopular opinions on the social and political questions of the day. She wore red lipstick and faded Levi’s. She was ahead of her time with her views on bilingualism in the classroom. She had many supporters, but some considered her a pain in the neck. From all reports, her students loved her and probably her cows did too. (She gave them all names: Vanilla Ice Cream, Dirty Face, Milagro, Old Rattlesnake.)"—Joan Sandin.

Bourne was (briefly) married three times, divorced twice, and widowed once. She lived much of her life at her homestead in Peppersauce Canyon above San Manuel, and later at her GF Bar Ranch on Copper Creek, east of Mammoth. Eulalia Bourne died on her ranch May 1, 1984 at 91 years of age.

Bourne received honors and awards from the U of A Alumni Association, the Arizona Press Women, the Arizona Women's Hall of Fame, and the National Cowgirl Museum Hall of Fame.

Books by Eulalia Bourne
Woman in Levi's, University of Arizona Press, 1967.  Online Version
Nine Months Is a Year: Teaching at Baboquivari School. University of Arizona Press, 1969. Online Version
Ranch Schoolteacher, University of Arizona Press, 1974.
The Blue Colt, Flagstaff, Northland Press, 1979.

References

Other sources
Joan Sandin, Sister Bourne: A Life of Teaching, Cow Punching, Broken Hearts, Broken Marriages, and Broken Bones, Arizona Alumnus, Vol. 81, no. 2 (Winter), pp. 30–33. Tucson, The University of Arizona Alumni Association.
School on the Range: The Little Cowpuncher Roundup, an online project of the University of Arizona Learning Technologies Center

External links
The Little Cowpuncher, 1932–1943
Biographical sketch at Arizona Women's Hall of Fame
Bourne at Baboquivari School, 1930's, Arizona Highways. Includes a 1930s photo of the author.

University of Arizona alumni
Schoolteachers from Arizona
20th-century American women educators
1892 births
1984 deaths
People from Pinal County, Arizona
Cowgirl Hall of Fame inductees
20th-century American educators